Nedim Kaleci (1900 – 22 July 1981) was a Turkish footballer. He competed in the men's tournament at the 1924 Summer Olympics.

References

External links
 

1900 births
1981 deaths
Turkish footballers
Turkey international footballers
Olympic footballers of Turkey
Footballers at the 1924 Summer Olympics
Footballers from Istanbul
Association football goalkeepers